Bogoljub is a Serbian masculine given name, meaning "love of God". It may refer to:

Bogoljub Jevtić (1886–1960), Serbian politician
Bogoljub Karić (born 1954), Serbian businessman and politician 
Bogoljub Kočović (1920–2013), Serbian jurist and statistician
Bogoljub Mitić (1969-2017), Serbian actor and comedian
Bogoljub Nedeljković (1920–1986), Serbian politician
Bogoljub Šijaković (born 1955), Serbian professor and politician

Further reading

Slavic masculine given names
Serbian masculine given names